Winemaking in Crimea has existed for over two thousand years.

History
Winemaking has been developed in Hersonissos, the Bosporan Kingdom, in the Principality of Theodoro and the Genoese colonies.

The Ottoman period was unfavourable to wine because of religious prohibition, but that was offset by the cult of table grapes. Although winemakers Muslims and punish sticks for the production of the drink, but Muslims are not subject to exorbitant taxes, which stimulated some move to another faith.

The period of the Russian Empire and the later Soviet period led to significant development for the industry and the emergence of a true  scientific approach to wine production. The adoption on April 24, 1914 of the "Law on grape wine" increased the vulnerability of the industry at the legislative level. The adoption on 25 May 1985 of the resolution entitled "Measures to Overcome Drunkenness and Alcoholism" led to substantial damage to Crimean and Soviet winemaking. It was during this period that many vineyards were destroyed and wineries were converted into extract plants.

The greatest reduction in the area of vineyards and consequent reduction in the volume of wine production in Crimea occurred after the collapse of the USSR.

Current situation
The current stage of development of viticulture and winemaking in Crimea is associated with the reorientation of producers from the Ukrainian to the Russian market, a process made more difficult by the requirement to adhere to the new regulatory framework of Russia.

In general, using protectionist mechanisms, the industry has chances for development and access to foreign markets (especially the Asia-Pacific region).

Notable Crimean winemakers include "Massandra", "Inkerman", "Sun Valley", "Gold beam", "Koktebel", "Magarach", "Suter", "Novyi Svit", "Legend of Crimea".

See also
 Russian wine
 Ukrainian wine
 Ukrainian cuisine
 Sovetskoye Shampanskoye

References

Wine regions
Economy of Crimea
Crimean culture
Ukrainian wine